Seyit Cem Ünsal (born 9 October 1975) is a Turkish professional footballer who plays as a forward. He was the first Turkish player in South Korea and Barcelona in Spain.

Club career
Ünsal began his professional career with local club Kayserispor in 1994. He played mainly for Turkish clubs, as well as for South Korean side Anyang LG Cheetahs between 1997 and 1998, making a total of 12 appearances and scoring 1 goal(1997 FA Cup) in all competitions.

References

Enternal links
 TFF profile
 
 Photograph at Anyang LG Cheetahs

1975 births
Living people
Footballers from Istanbul
Turkish footballers
Süper Lig players
Association football forwards
Turkish expatriate footballers
Turkish expatriate sportspeople in South Korea
Expatriate footballers in South Korea
Expatriate footballers in Spain
Turkish expatriate sportspeople in Spain
Kayserispor footballers
Trabzonspor footballers
Kocaelispor footballers
Batman Petrolspor footballers
K League 1 players
FC Seoul players
FC Barcelona players